The 1955–56 La Liga was the 25th season since its establishment. Athletic Bilbao achieved their sixth title.

Team locations

League table

Results

Relegation group

Standings

Results

Top scorers

External links
 Official LFP Site

1955 1956
1955–56 in Spanish football leagues
Spain